Robert Kendall Lazarsfeld (born April 15, 1953) is an American mathematician, currently a professor at Stony Brook University.  He was previously the Raymond L. Wilder Collegiate Professor of Mathematics at the University of Michigan. He is the son of two sociologists, Paul Lazarsfeld and Patricia Kendall. His research focuses on algebraic geometry.

During 2002–2009, Lazarsfeld was an editor at the Journal of the American Mathematical Society (Managing Editor, 2007–2009). In 2012–2013, he served as the Managing Editor of the Michigan Mathematical Journal.

Lazarsfeld went to Harvard for undergraduate studies and earned his doctorate from Brown University in 1980 under supervision of William Fulton.

In 2006 Lazarsfeld was elected a Fellow of the American Academy of Arts and Sciences. In 2012 he became a fellow of the American Mathematical Society. In 2015 he was awarded the AMS Leroy P. Steele Prize for Mathematical Exposition.

Selected works
;

References

External links
Website at Stony Brook University

1953 births
Living people
Algebraic geometers
20th-century American mathematicians
21st-century American mathematicians
Brown University alumni
University of California, Los Angeles faculty
University of Michigan faculty
Fellows of the American Academy of Arts and Sciences
Fellows of the American Mathematical Society
Harvard University alumni
Scientists from New York City
Mathematicians from New York (state)
Lazarsfeld family